Bionychiurus is a genus of the family Onychiuridae, a group of springtails. Genus Bionychiurus was established by Pomoroski in the year 1996, based on the morphological features of the first instar larvae of Onychiurus normalis. Later, Weiner established a new genus Bangallophorus based on O. normalis; but Pomorski synonymized Bangallophorus with Bionychiurus in 1998.

Species 
The following species are accepted within Bionychiurus:

 Bionychiurus changbaiensis Sun & Wu, 2012
 Bionychiurus normalis (Gisin, 1949)
 Bionychiurus oblongatus (Lee & Park, 1986)
 Bionychiurus orghidani (Gruia, M, 1967)
 Bionychiurus qinglongensis Sun, X & Wu, D-H, 2014
 Bionychiurus tamilensis Thunnisa et al., 2021
 Bionychiurus yongyeonensis (Yosii, R, 1966)

References 

Collembola
Animals described in 1996